Zaviyeh is a city in Markazi Province, Iran.

Zaviyeh or Zaveyeh or Zavieh may also refer to:

Ardabil Province
Zaviyeh Qeshlaq, Ardabil Province
Zaviyeh Sang, Ardabil Province
Zaviyeh-ye Jafarabad, Ardabil Province
Zaviyeh-ye Kivi, Ardabil Province
Zaviyeh-ye Kord, Ardabil Province
Zaviyeh-ye Sadat, Ardabil Province
Zaviyeh-ye Zarjabad, Ardabil Province

East Azerbaijan Province
Zaviyeh, Ajab Shir, a village in Ajab Shir County
Zaviyeh, Hashtrud, a village in Hashtrud County
Zaviyeh, Jolfa, a village in Jolfa County
Zaviyeh, Kaleybar, a village in Kaleybar County
Zaviyeh, Meyaneh, a village in Meyaneh County

Kerman Province

Khuzestan Province
Zaviyeh Hajjian, Khuzestan Province, Iran
Zaviyeh Hamudi, Khuzestan Province, Iran
Zaviyeh Khersan, Khuzestan Province, Iran
Zaviyeh Mashali, Khuzestan Province, Iran
Zaviyeh Moradi, Khuzestan Province, Iran

West Azerbaijan Province
 Zaviyeh-ye Olya, a village in Chaldoran County
 Zaviyeh-ye Sofla, a village in Chaldoran County
 Zaviyeh, West Azerbaijan, a village in Khoy County
 Zaviyeh-e Hasan Khan, a village in Khoy County
 Zaviyeh-e Sheykh Lar, a village in Khoy County

See also
Zeyva, Iran (disambiguation)